Tiffany Ariana Trump (born October 13, 1993) is the fourth child of former U.S. President Donald Trump and his only child with his second wife, Marla Maples. She is a legal research assistant at Georgetown University Law Center.

Early life and education
Tiffany Ariana Trump was born on October 13, 1993, at St. Mary's Medical Center in West Palm Beach, Florida, two months before her parents married. She is Donald Trump's only child with his second wife, actress and television personality Marla Maples, whom he married in December 1993. She was named after jeweler Tiffany & Co.; her father purchased the air rights above the company's Fifth Avenue flagship store in the 1980s while building Trump Tower next door. Her parents divorced in 1999 after being separated for two years. She was raised by her mother in California.

She has three older half-siblings, Donald Jr., Ivanka and Eric, from Donald Trump's first wife, Ivana, and a younger half-brother, Barron, from Trump's third wife, Melania.

Trump attended Viewpoint School in Calabasas, California, graduating in 2012. She attended University of Pennsylvania (her father's alma mater) and graduated in 2016 with a Bachelor of Arts degree in sociology with a concentration in law and society, and was a member of Kappa Alpha Theta sorority. She then entered Georgetown University Law Center in Washington, D.C. and was awarded a Doctor of Jurisprudence (JD) degree in May 2020.

Career
In 2011, Trump released a music single called "Like a Bird". She later told The Oprah Winfrey Show that she was evaluating whether to take her music career "to the next level as a professional".

In 2015, Trump worked as an intern for Vogue and, in 2016, modeled for an Andrew Warren fashion show during New York Fashion Week.

2016 and 2020 presidential campaigns

Trump made numerous appearances during her father's 2016 presidential campaign. She spoke at the 2016 Republican National Convention on the second night of the convention.

Trump again campaigned for her father in 2020, including speaking at the 2020 Republican National Convention. She spoke at several in-person campaign events in the weeks before the election.

Professional career 
Trump has remained with Georgetown Law after graduating in 2020, working as a research assistant for Professor Shon Hopwood.

Personal life
In summer 2018, while on vacation in Greece with actress Lindsay Lohan, Trump met Michael Boulos, a Lebanese-American billionaire heir and business executive whose family owns Boulos Enterprises and SCOA Nigeria in Nigeria. She has been in a relationship with Boulos since 2018. They were married on November 12, 2022, at Mar-a-Lago in Palm Beach, Florida.

Trump is a frequent poster on Instagram, where she had 1.4 million followers . Her Instagram posts have frequently included photographs of herself with friends or with descendants of famous parents or grandparents, such as Kyra Kennedy, Gaïa Jacquet-Matisse, Reya Benitez, Ezra J. William, and EJ Johnson. The group has been named the "rich kids of Instagram" by the New York Post and the "Snap Pack" by The New York Times and New York magazine.

See also
 List of Kappa Alpha Theta sisters
 List of children of presidents of the United States

References

External links

 
 
 

1993 births
20th-century American women
21st-century American women
American Internet celebrities
American people of German descent
American people of Scottish descent
American socialites
California Republicans
Children of presidents of the United States
Female models from California
Female models from Philadelphia
Georgetown University Law Center alumni
Living people
New York (state) Republicans
Pennsylvania Republicans
People from Calabasas, California
People from Manhattan
People from West Palm Beach, Florida
Tiffany
University of Pennsylvania alumni
Daughters of national leaders
Children of Donald Trump